Jean-Claude Castera (born 1939) is a Haitian painter born in Pétion-Ville, a wealthy suburb of Port-au-Prince, Castera was educated in San Juan, Puerto Rico. He typically paints abstract scenes and women.

References
 

1939 births
Haitian artists
Haitian painters
Haitian male painters
Living people
People from Ouest (department)
Date of birth missing (living people)